Matěj Hybš (born 3 January 1993) is a Czech professional footballer who plays as a left-back for Czech First League side Teplice on loan from Viktoria Plzeň.

Club career
He made his league debut on 12 August 2012 in Czech First League match against 1. FC Slovácko. In August 2014 he was loaned for one year to Czech first league club FC Vysočina Jihlava.

International career
He represented the Czech Republic at every youth level except Under-20.

Honours
Sparta Prague
Czech First League: 2013–14
Czech Cup: 2013–14

Viktoria Plzeň
Czech First League: 2021–22

References

 
 Profile at iDNES.cz

1993 births
Living people
Footballers from Prague
Association football fullbacks
Association football defenders
Czech footballers
Czech Republic youth international footballers
Czech Republic under-21 international footballers
Czech First League players
Ekstraklasa players
AC Sparta Prague players
FC Vysočina Jihlava players
FC Slovan Liberec players
FK Jablonec players
FC Viktoria Plzeň players
Bruk-Bet Termalica Nieciecza players
Czech expatriate footballers
Expatriate footballers in Poland
Czech expatriate sportspeople in Poland
FK Teplice players